Samarbeidende Sparebanker AS is a Norwegian bank holding company that owns 19.50 percent of SpareBank 1 Gruppen. As of 2012 the group was owned by the following Norwegian savings banks:

SpareBank 1 Buskerud-Vestfold
SpareBank 1 Østfold Akershus
SpareBank 1 Hallingdal
SpareBank 1 Gudbrandsdal
SpareBank 1 Ringerike Hadeland
SpareBank 1 Nordvest og
SpareBank 1 Nøtterøy–Tønsberg
SpareBank 1 Telemark
SpareBank 1 Lom og Skjå
SpareBank 1 Modum
SpareBank 1 Søre Sunnmøre

References

Financial services companies of Norway
SpareBank 1